Allan Rae may refer to:

Allan Rae (composer) (born 1942), Canadian composer
Allan Rae (cricketer) (1922–2005), Jamaican cricketer who played Test cricket for the West Indies

See also
Allen Rae (1932–2016), Canadian basketball referee
Allan Ray (born 1984), American basketball player